Carnatic music is the classical music of South India. The following lists provide links to concert artists who have been widely recognised.

Vocalists - born before 1800

Dharma Raja Karthika Thirunal Rama Varma, born 1724
Tyagaraja, born 1767
Irayimman Thampi, born 1782
Shadkala Govinda Marar, born 1798, Endaro Mahanubhavulu was sung by Tyagaraja after he heard Marar sing.

Vocalists - born between 1801 and 1900

Vocalists - born between 1901 and 1925

Vocalists - born between 1926 and 1950

Vocalists born between 1951 and 1975

Vocalists born between 1976 and 2000

Vocalists - born after 2000

 Rahul Vellal, born 2007

Other vocalists

References

 
India music-related lists
Lists of singers